Events in the year 1983 in Japan.

Incumbents
Emperor: Hirohito (Emperor Shōwa)
Prime Minister: Yasuhiro Nakasone (L–Gunma, 1st term until 27 December 2nd term from 27 December)
 Chief Cabinet Secretary: Masaharu Gotōda (L–Tokushima) until December 27, Takao Fujinami (L–Mie)
 Chief Justice of the Supreme Court: Jirō Terata
 President of the House of Representatives: Hajime Fukuda (L–Fukui) until November 28 Kenji Fukunaga (L–Saitama) from December 26
 President of the House of Councillors: Masatoshi Tokunata (L–national) until July 9, Mutsuo Kimura (L–Okayama) from July 18
 Diet sessions: 98th (regular session opened in December 1982, to May 26), 99th (extraordinary, July 18 to July 23), 100th (extraordinary, September 8 to November 28; note that the next regular Diet session was already scheduled to start on December 15 when the House was dissolved in the wake of Kakuei Tanaka's conviction in the Lockheed scandal case), 101st (special, December 26 to 1984)

Governors
Aichi Prefecture: Yoshiaki Nakaya (until 14 February); Reiji Suzuki (starting 15 February)
Akita Prefecture: Kikuji Sasaki 
Aomori Prefecture: Masaya Kitamura 
Chiba Prefecture: Takeshi Numata 
Ehime Prefecture: Haruki Shiraishi 
Fukui Prefecture: Heidayū Nakagawa 
Fukuoka Prefecture: Hikaru Kamei (until 22 April); Hachiji Okuda (starting 23 April)
Fukushima Prefecture: Isao Matsudaira 
Gifu Prefecture: Yosuke Uematsu 
Gunma Prefecture: Ichiro Shimizu 
Hiroshima Prefecture: Toranosuke Takeshita 
Hokkaido: Naohiro Dōgakinai (until 22 April); Takahiro Yokomichi (starting 23 April)
Hyogo Prefecture: Tokitada Sakai
Ibaraki Prefecture: Fujio Takeuchi 
Ishikawa Prefecture: Yōichi Nakanishi 
Iwate Prefecture:   
Kagawa Prefecture: Tadao Maekawa 
Kagoshima Prefecture: Kaname Kamada 
Kanagawa Prefecture: Kazuji Nagasu 
Kochi Prefecture: Chikara Nakauchi  
Kumamoto Prefecture: Issei Sawada (until 10 February); Morihiro Hosokawa (starting 10 February)
Kyoto Prefecture: Yukio Hayashida 
Mie Prefecture: Ryōzō Tagawa 
Miyagi Prefecture: Sōichirō Yamamoto 
Miyazaki Prefecture: Suketaka Matsukata 
Nagano Prefecture: Gorō Yoshimura 
Nagasaki Prefecture: Isamu Takada 
Nara Prefecture: Shigekiyo Ueda 
Niigata Prefecture: Takeo Kimi 
Oita Prefecture: Morihiko Hiramatsu 
Okayama Prefecture: Shiro Nagano 
Okinawa Prefecture: Junji Nishime 
Osaka Prefecture: Sakae Kishi
Saga Prefecture: Kumao Katsuki 
Saitama Prefecture: Yawara Hata 
Shiga Prefecture: Masayoshi Takemura 
Shiname Prefecture: Seiji Tsunematsu 
Shizuoka Prefecture: Keizaburō Yamamoto 
Tochigi Prefecture: Yuzuru Funada 
Tokushima Prefecture: Shinzo Miki 
Tokyo: Shun'ichi Suzuki 
Tottori Prefecture: Kōzō Hirabayashi (until 9 March); Yuji Nishio (starting 13 April)
Toyama Prefecture: Yutaka Nakaoki
Wakayama Prefecture: Shirō Kariya  
Yamagata Prefecture: Seiichirō Itagaki 
Yamaguchi Prefecture: Toru Hirai 
Yamanashi Prefecture: Kōmei Mochizuki

Events

 Korean Air Lines Flight 007
 February 21 - A hotel fire in Zao Spa, Yamagata, according to Fire and Disaster Management Agency of Japan official confirmed report, 11 people died, 2 were wounded.
 April 15 - Tokyo Disneyland opens.
 April 19 - A C-1 transport plane crash off coast Toba, Mie Prefecture, according to official results, 14 people died.
 May 26 - The 7.8  Sea of Japan earthquake shakes northern Honshu with a maximum Mercalli intensity of VIII (Severe). A destructive tsunami is generated that leaves about 100 people dead.
 May 28 - Golgo 13: The Professional is released in cinemas in Japan.
 June 26 - House of Councillors election
 July 15 - Nintendo's Famicom is released in Japan.
 July 29 – According to Japanese government official confirmed report, heavy massive torrential rain and debris flow occur hit in Masuda, Hamada and Tsuwano, around western Honshu, according to Japan Fire and Disaster Management Agency official confirm report, 117 persons were human fatalities and 193 persons were wounded.
   
 October 12 - Ex-Prime Minister Kakuei Tanaka found guilty of accepting $2 million bribe from Lockheed Corporation, receives 4-year jail sentence.
 November 11 - Ronald Reagan first US President to address Diet.
 November 22- A gas explosion occurred on resort facility in Kakegawa, Shizuoka Prefecture, according to Fire and Disaster Management Agency official confirmed report, 14 people died, 27 people were wounded.
 November 28 - In the wake of former Liberal Democratic Party president Kakuei Tanaka's conviction in the Lockheed scandal case, the House of Representatives is dissolved and early elections are called for December.
 December 18 - In the 37th general election for the House of Representatives, Liberal Democrats lose their majority for the second time after the "Lockheed election" of 1976. Party president Yasuhiro Nakasone forms the first coalition government in party history with the New Liberal Club. Kakuei Tanaka defends his seat in Niigata 3rd district with a record result.

Popular culture

Arts and entertainment

In anime, the winners of Animage's Anime Grand Prix were the film Crusher Joe for best work, episode 26 (Ai wa nagareru) of The Super Dimension Fortress Macross for best episode, Chirico Cuvie (voiced by Hozumi Gōda) from Armored Trooper Votoms for best male character, Misa Hayase (voiced by Mika Doi) from The Super Dimension Fortress Macross for best female character, Akira Kamiya for best voice actor, Mami Koyama for best voice actress and the opening of Ginga Hyōryū Vifam, Hello Vifam by TAO for best song. For a list of anime released in 1983 see Category:1983 anime.

In film, The Ballad of Narayama by Shōhei Imamura won the Best film award at the Japan Academy Prize, The Family Game by Yoshimitsu Morita won Best film at the Hochi Film Awards and at the Yokohama Film Festival and Tokyo Trial by Masaki Kobayashi won Best film at the Blue Ribbon Awards. For a list of Japanese films released in 1983 see Japanese films of 1983.

In manga, the winners of the Shogakukan Manga Award were Hidamari no Ki by Osamu Tezuka (general), Musashi no Ken by Motoka Murakami (shōnen), Kisshō Tennyo by Akimi Yoshida (shōjo) and Panku Ponk by Haruko Tachiiri (children). Domu: A Child's Dream by Katsuhiro Otomo won the Seiun Award for Best Comic of the Year. For a list of manga released in 1983 see :Category:1983 manga.

In music, the 34th Kōhaku Uta Gassen was won by the White Team (men). Takashi Hosokawa won the 25th Japan Record Awards, held on December 31, and the FNS Music Festival.

In television, see: 1983 in Japanese television.

Japan hosted the Miss International 1983 beauty pageant, won by Costa Rican Gidget Sandoval.

Sports
In football (soccer), Japan hosted the 1983 Intercontinental Cup between Hamburger SV and Grêmio, won by Grêmio 2-1. Yomiuri won the Japan Soccer League. For the champions of the regional leagues see: 1983 Japanese Regional Leagues.

In volleyball, Japan hosted and won the Men's and Women's Asian Volleyball Championship.

Births
January 1 - Emi Kobayashi, model and actress
January 14 - Takako Uehara, singer
January 19 - Hikaru Utada, singer and songwriter
January 20 - Mari Yaguchi, singer and actress
January 25 - Yasuyuki Konno, footballer
February 19 
Nozomi Sasaki, voice actress
Mika Nakashima, singer and actress
March 20 - Eiji Kawashima, footballer
May 9 - Ryuhei Matsuda, actor
May 12
Kan Otake, professional baseball player
Yujiro Kushida, wrestler and mixed martial artist
May 17 - Nobuhiro Matsuda, professional baseball player
June 8 - Mamoru Miyano, voice actor
June 17 - Kazunari Ninomiya, actor, idol and singer
July 5 - Kumiko Ogura, badminton player
July 12 - Megumi Kawamura, model
July 24 - Asami Mizukawa, actress
August 30 
 Jun Matsumoto, singer and actor
 Naoto Kataoka, singer and actor 
September 22 - Eriko Imai, singer
September 30 
 Machiko Kawana, voice actress  
 Reiko Shiota, badminton player
October 3 - Hiroki Suzuki, actor
October 4 - Risa Kudō, gravure idol 
October 12 - Mariko Yamamoto
October 25 - Princess Yōko of Mikasa
November 11
Sora Aoi, model
Tatsuhisa Suzuki, voice actor
November 25 - Atsushi Itō, actor
November 26 - Emiri Katō, voice actress and singer  
December 28 - Aiko Nakamura, tennis player

Deaths
 January 9: Ichiro Nakagawa, politician (b. 1925)
 January 15: Masatane Kanda, lieutenant general (b. 1890)
 January 21: Ton Satomi, author (b. 1888)
 March 1: Hideo Kobayashi, author (b. 1902)
 March 31: Chiezō Kataoka, actor (b. 1903)
 April 13: Nakamura Ganjirō II, film actor (b. 1902)
 May 4: Shūji Terayama, poet, dramatist, writer, film director, and photographer (b. 1935)
 July 26: Kimiyoshi Yasuda, film director (b. 1911)
 September 4: Katsutoshi Nekoda, volleyball player (b. 1944)
 October 23: Toru Takahashi, race car driver (b. 1960)
 November 2: Tamura Taijiro, novelist (b. 1911)

See also
 1983 in Japanese television
 List of Japanese films of 1983

References

 
Japan
Years of the 20th century in Japan